La Panza Canyon is a valley in the La Panza Range in San Luis Obispo County, California.  Its mouth is at an elevation of 1509 feet (460m).

This canyon was the site of a gold strike and gold rush in 1878, that led to the founding of La Panza, California.

See also 

 Lingo Canyon

References

Landforms of San Luis Obispo County, California